New York State Route 17H may refer to:

New York State Route 17H (1930–1937) in Cattaraugus County
New York State Route 17H (1940s–1971) in Broome County